Colonel Richard Francis Abel Smith DL (11 October 1933  – 23 December 2004) was a British Army officer.

He was the son of Colonel Sir Henry Abel Smith (1900–1993) and his wife Lady May Cambridge (1906-1994), née Princess May of Teck, a great-granddaughter of Queen Victoria and a niece of Queen Mary. He was born at Kensington Palace in London, England. Richard was the second of three children and the only boy. He was a great-great-grandson of Queen Victoria.

Education
Abel Smith was educated at Eton College, Eton, Berkshire, England; the Royal Military Academy Sandhurst, Berkshire, England; and the Royal Agricultural College, Cirencester, Gloucestershire, England.

Military career
He was commissioned into the Royal Horse Guards (The Blues). He was Aide-de-Camp to the Governor of Cyprus between 1957 and 1960. He was a military instructor between 1960 and 1963 at Sandhurst. He commanded the Sherwood Rangers Yeomanry squadron of the Royal Yeomanry between 1967 and 1969. He held the office of Deputy Lieutenant (D.L.) of Nottinghamshire between 1970 and 1991 and High Sheriff of Nottinghamshire in 1978. He gained the rank of Honorary Colonel in 1979 in the service of the Sherwood Rangers Yeomanry Regiment, which he held until 1989. He held the office of Vice Lord Lieutenant of Nottinghamshire between 1991 and 1999.

Personal life
He married Marcia Kendrew (born 27 March 1940; daughter of Sir Douglas Kendrew, a future Governor of Western Australia) on 28 April 1960 in St. Mary Abbott's Church, Kensington, London, England. Consent for the marriage was required under the Royal Marriages Act 1772. They had a daughter, Katherine Emma Abel Smith (born 11 March 1961).

Later life
He died of a stroke at home in Blidworth Dale, Nottinghamshire, England on 23 December 2004. He was buried on 18 January 2005 in St James, Papplewick, Nottinghamshire, England.

References

1933 births
2004 deaths
British military personnel of the Cyprus Emergency
Deputy Lieutenants of Nottinghamshire
Royal Horse Guards officers
People educated at Eton College
Graduates of the Royal Military Academy Sandhurst
Alumni of the Royal Agricultural University
High Sheriffs of Nottinghamshire
Royal Yeomanry officers
Richard
Sherwood Rangers Yeomanry officers
People from Blidworth
Military personnel from London